The 2004–05 La Liga season, the 74th since its establishment, started on 28 August 2004 and finished on 29 May 2005.

Teams
Twenty teams competed in the league – the top seventeen teams from the previous season and the three teams promoted from the Segunda División. The promoted teams were Levante (playing top flight football for the first time in thirty nine years), Getafe (playing in the top flight for the first time ever) and Numancia (returning after a three-year absence). They replaced Valladolid, Celta de Vigo and Murcia after spending time in the top flight for eleven, twelve and one years respectively.

Team information

Clubs and locations

2004–05 season was composed of the following clubs:

(*) Promoted from Segunda División.

League table

Overall
Most wins – Barcelona and Real Madrid (25)
Fewest wins – Numancia and Albacete (6)
Most draws – Valencia (16)
Fewest draws – Real Madrid (5)
Most losses – Albacete (22)
Fewest losses – Barcelona (4)
Most goals scored – Barcelona (73)
Fewest goals scored – Numancia (30)
Most goals conceded – Osasuna (65)
Fewest goals conceded – Barcelona (29)

Results

Awards

Pichichi Trophy
The Pichichi Trophy is awarded to the player who scores the most goals in a season.

Zamora Trophy
The Zamora Trophy is awarded to the goalkeeper with least goals to games ratio.

Fair Play award
This season, the award was not published neither given to any club due to an administrative affair.

Hat-tricks

See also
 2004–05 Segunda División
 2004–05 Copa del Rey

References

External links

La Liga seasons
1
Spain